Aliso Canyon is a  canyon located in Orange County, California in the United States. The canyon is a water gap across the San Joaquin Hills carved out by Aliso Creek, possibly as recently as the last ice age. Located in a semi-arid climate, it supports a variety of plant communities – mainly chaparral and coastal sage scrub – and native animals, some endangered.

The canyon's northern divide once formed a formidable boundary between the indigenous Acjachemen and Tongva. Many Acjachemen archaeological sites have been found in the canyon. The fertile alluvial soil and grasslands of Aliso Canyon was used for orchards and grazing from Spanish conquest of the region until the early 20th century. Since the 1970s, the canyon has been the centerpiece of Aliso and Wood Canyons Wilderness Park.

Aliso Canyon has also suffered environmental damage in recent years. Upstream urban development since the 1950s has increased urban runoff into Aliso Creek, causing severe erosion throughout the valley floor. Pollution has also harmed the area's riparian zones. There have been plans to fix these problems, mainly by constructing drop structures to control erosion.

Description

Geography
Aliso Canyon is a massive gap through the south-central part of the San Joaquin Hills. Others include the Laguna Canyon and the San Juan Creek canyon.

These hills are dissected by many steep and short side canyons.

Cities bounding the canyon are Laguna Beach to the south and west, Laguna Niguel to the east, and Aliso Viejo to the northeast.

Geologic history
Despite its size, Aliso Canyon likely formed as recently as the Wisconsinian glaciation of the last glacial period, a length of time lasting from 60,000–10,000 years ago. During this time the San Joaquin Hills began to rise to their present-day form. (The uplift had actually begun as early as 1.22 million years ago, but the previous mountains had been eroded.) The Wisconsinian glaciation caused a shift in the entire climate of North America, pushing the cold, rainy climate of the Pacific Northwest south into California. The difference in sea level caused by the Wisconsinian glaciation was likely around - from the previous sea level, in the Sangamonian Satge, which was also about  higher than the present-day sea level.

Aliso Creek cut a V-shaped river valley through the San Joaquin Hills over this time span. When the Wisconsinian era ended, the glaciers melted and sea levels rose  or so to their present level. Water backed up into Aliso Canyon and Wood Canyons, turning them into salt-water inlets. Over time, the creeks deposited enough sediment to fill the inlets with alluvium and create the present-day valley floor. This is the reason why the canyon resembles an aged U-shaped glacial valley instead of a relatively young V-shaped river valley.

Man-made modifications
Historically, the Aliso Canyon floor was occupied by wide and braided Aliso Creek, which changed course often and flowed in a wide and shallow channel. Although the creek through the canyon remains unchannelized, it has suffered a series of effects from increasing runoff and pollution. Upstream development which has resulted in increased runoff with little sediment content has caused the creek to incise a -deep, -wide channel through the entire length of the valley. The creek now is continuing to incise through the soft alluvial soil and a community of exotic giant reed has established itself throughout the length of the valley.

There are two roads through Aliso Canyon, following opposite sides of the creek. One is the paved Aliso Creek trail and one is an unpaved private road that leads to a wastewater treatment plant near the mouth of the canyon, owned by the South Orange Water Conservation Agency (SOCWA). There is one dam and one weir across the creek as it flows through the valley. There are also many drop structures on Wood Canyon Creek and there is a sewer line that follows most of the length of the canyon.

Except for some private development at the mouth of the canyon, the entire Aliso Canyon is mostly undeveloped. This private development consists of a hotel and golf course that also has a stretch of channelized creek. This section of canyon, the steepest and narrowest part, is also vulnerable to flooding during wet years.

Wildlife and plants
The Aliso Canyon has four major vegetation zones; these are riparian, chaparral, coastal sage scrub and grassland. Historically, there were salt marshes at the mouth of Aliso Creek, which sustained a large population of tidewater goby. These marshes, however, have now been eradicated by the construction of a sewage treatment plant at the mouth. Oak and sycamore trees make up the primary large plants along Wood Canyon Creek, and alder (which gave the canyon its name), live oak and other plants line Aliso Creek. Most of the rest of the valley floor, stretching from the edge of the riparian zone to the beginning of the hillside, is grassland. The side canyons and slopes are divided among chaparral and coastal sage scrub. Some non-native plants have begun to establish themselves from the fringes of residential areas on the bordering ridges.

Bobcats, mountain lions, lynx and coyotes are some of the large mammals that inhabit the Aliso Canyon area. There are also more than 100 species of birds, some endangered, including the California gnatcatcher and occasionally, the bald eagle. Carp are the only remaining fish that inhabit the lower Aliso Creek. It has been proven by a local NGO, CLEAN WATER NOW, that historically the Endangered Species Act listed Southern steelhead trout in 1997 as having spawned and resided in the creek. This was sustained by NOAA (NMFS), CDFW, and USF&W. It disappeared in the early 1970s according to local fishermen. The bald eagles that once resided here fed upon the steelhead as did the Native American tribes.

History
Evidence suggests that Aliso Creek was once the boundary of the Acjachemen and Tongva tribes, but Aliso Canyon likely lay completely on Acjachemen land. The mountains to the north and west of the canyon rise more sharply and rise higher than those on the south and east. The northern drainage divide of the gorge marked the boundary in this area, and the Acjachemen settled in small villages all along the valley floor. Fed by springs in the Santa Ana Mountains and some in the canyon itself, Aliso Creek ran year round through the canyon and supported a lush riparian ecosystem with many tall trees and smaller undergrowth.

When the Spanish established missions along nearby larger rivers, they forced most of the Native Americans to live at the missions, and Aliso Canyon lay abandoned for many years following the 1770s. The fertile alluvium and extensive grasslands of the canyon floor were used primarily for grazing cattle. Several corrals still stand in the Wood Canyon area today. In 1871, pioneer Eugene Salter settled at the canyon mouth, but one year after, sold it to the Thurstons, who cultivated the present-day golf course area as an orchard.

Eventually when the city of Laguna Beach was founded in 1926, the area at the mouth of Aliso Canyon, including Laguna Beach, became a popular camping area. The inn and golf course was begun in the 1960s and grew throughout the remainder of the 20th century. A proposal to extend the golf course into the canyon and expand it to 18 holes was eventually stopped. In the 1960s, Orange County began to fall victim to heavy urbanization, and to protect the canyon from further development, Aliso and Wood Canyons Regional Park was established in 1979 and expanded to its present size by 1990.

A later project to restore a riparian zone in the canyon, the Aliso Creek Wildlife Habitat Enhancement Project (ACWHEP) involved damming the creek and constructing pipelines from the impoundment to irrigate artificial creekside terraces of native plants, as well as prevent further erosion of the canyon floor by urban runoff. Due to a flaw in the design, the dam actually caused further erosion, and the irrigation pipes are now broken and the terraces lie fallow.

Archaeology and paleontology

Marine fossils

The Pecten Reef in the northeast section of the canyon area is an above-ground exposure of the Monterey Formation, which dates back to the Miocene period. Thousands of fossils and specimens of marine mammals, fish, reptiles and coastal birds have been discovered at the site, implying that the site was once underwater. Preserved invertebrates, plankton, bryozoa, and rare red, blue and brown algae have also been found there. Much of the scientific understanding for evolution, paleoenvironments and paleoclimates during the Miocene period in Orange County is based on the specimens collected from the Pecten Reef.

Evidence of human habitation
About 70 archaeological sites have been discovered along the length of the canyon.

References

External links

 OC Parks: Aliso and Wood Canyons Regional Park

 

Valleys of California
Landforms of Orange County, California
San Joaquin Hills
Water gaps of the United States